Hereford Road Skew Bridge is a disused railway bridge in Ledbury, Herefordshire. Built in 1881 to carry the Ledbury and Gloucester Railway across the Hereford Road at an angle of approximately 45°, it was built as a ribbed skew arch with stone spandrels and wing walls, and ribs of blue brick.
The railway line was closed in 1959 and the bridge is now used as part of the Ledbury Town Trail footpath.

History
The Herefordshire and Gloucestershire Canal opened in two phases in 1798 and 1845, but in 1863, after a period of financial difficulty, it was leased to the Great Western Railway and in 1881 work started on converting the southern section into a railway.
The Ross and Ledbury Railway Company's intention was to build a line between Ledbury and Ross-on-Wye via Dymock, where the Newent Railway Company planned a junction and a line that would link to the Great Western Railway at Over Junction, west of Gloucester. Both companies received Parliamentary approval in 1873, but due to financial difficulties building was delayed for two years, by which time the Ross and Ledbury Railway had abandoned its plan to reach Ross and linked with the Newent Railway head-on to provide a through route from Ledbury to Gloucester.

The line opened to traffic on 27 July 1885, when the existing Ledbury station was renamed Ledbury Junction, the Ledbury and Gloucester line curving away from the Worcester and Hereford Railway line on an embankment immediately west of the station.
Just south of the junction the double-track line was carried at an awkward angle of approximately 45° over the Hereford Road, now part of the A438, by an arch bridge of "unusual design".

The two smaller companies were amalgamated into the Great Western Railway in 1892, and on 4 January 1917 the double track between Ledbury and Dymock was singled to provide materials for the Great War. The line closed to passenger traffic on 11 July 1959, with the section between Ledbury and Dymock closing completely and Ledbury Junction station reverting to its old name, while the southern section remained open to freight traffic until 30 May 1964. Many bridges along the closed line were dismantled and in some cases just the abutments remain, but Hereford Road bridge remains intact and is currently in use as part of the Ledbury Town Trail footpath, with a nearby information board making the following extravagant claim:

The skew canal bridge to which reference is made is still in place at Monkhide, carrying a minor road over one of the few remaining stretches of the old canal.
However, now that the railway has been dismantled the canal has become the subject of an active and ambitious restoration scheme.

Design and architecture
The oblique bridge was built in 1881 and constructed with stone abutments, parapet walls, spandrels and wing walls but to accommodate the skew it was built with 13 separate staggered but overlapping ribs in blue brick.
This method of construction was first proposed by British-born American architect Benjamin Henry Latrobe in 1802 and later championed by French civil engineer A. Boucher, and has the advantage of being one of the simpler ways of building a skew arch, but set against that it has received considerable criticism for being "weak, ugly and wasteful of materials".
The bridge is relatively unadorned and devoid of fussy detail. The smooth blue brick ribs contrast with the rusticated pink sandstone and the east parapet wall carries a plain date stone to mark 1881 as the year of construction.

Gallery

See also
 Southdown Road Skew Bridge – a brick ribbed skew arch of even greater obliquity.
 Skew arch – a discussion of ribbed and other forms of skew bridge.

Notes

References

Railway bridges in Herefordshire
Arch bridges in the United Kingdom
Skew bridges
Bridges completed in 1881
Former railway bridges in the United Kingdom
Ledbury